Harry Elias (4 May 1937 – 26 August 2020) was a Singaporean veteran lawyer and Senior Counsel. One of Singapore's best litigation lawyers, he was made a Senior Counsel in 1997.

Elias was instrumental in founding the Criminal Legal Aid Scheme, and also founded the eponymous firm, Harry Elias Partnership LLP.

Elias died after a long illness on 26 August 2020 at the age of 83.

References

1937 births
2020 deaths
20th-century Singaporean lawyers
Singaporean Jews
Singaporean Senior Counsel